The Rhine–Main–Danube Canal (German: Rhein-Main-Donau-Kanal; also called Main-Danube Canal, RMD Canal or Europa Canal), is a canal in Bavaria, Germany. Connecting the Main and the Danube rivers across the European Watershed, it runs from Bamberg via Nuremberg to Kelheim. The canal connects the North Sea and Atlantic Ocean to the Black Sea, providing a navigable artery between the Rhine delta (at Rotterdam in the Netherlands), and the Danube Delta in south-eastern Romania and south-western Ukraine (or Constanța, through the Danube–Black Sea Canal).

Early history 
Projects for connecting the Danube and Rhine basins by canal have a long history. In 793, the Emperor Charlemagne ordered the construction of a canal—the Fossa Carolina (German: Karlsgraben)—connecting the Swabian Rezat, a tributary of the Rednitz, to the Altmühl near Treuchtlingen. Between 1836 and 1846 the Ludwig Canal (German: Ludwigskanal), named for King Ludwig I of Bavaria, was built between Bamberg and Kelheim. This canal had a narrow channel, with many locks, and a shortage of water in the peak section, so the operation of the waterway soon became uneconomic—especially given the rapidly advancing construction of the railway network in the southern German countryside. The canal finally was abandoned in 1950, after a decision was made to not repair damage it had suffered from Allied bombing during World War II.

In 1917, the Landtag of Bavaria passed a law calling for the development of a major shipping route "between Aschaffenburg and Passau", with the capacity to carry the 1,200-ton ships used on the Rhine. On 13 June 1921, Bavaria and the German Reich concluded an agreement to build the "Main-Donau-Wasserstraße".
Under this plan, in addition to the expansion of the Main and Danube, a completely new channel linking the rivers was to be created. The Rhein-Main-Donau AG (RMD-AG) was founded on 30 December 1921 to undertake the project. To finance the waterway, the RMD was given control of the water resources of the Main, Danube, Lech, Altmühl, and Regnitz.

Construction 
The first concrete plans for the new waterway emerged in 1938, for the so-called Mindorfer Linie south of Nuremberg. As early as 1939 the first preparatory work began at Thalmässing in Landkreis Roth. However, after the war this route was dropped. By 1962, the Main's channel had been expanded as far upstream as Bamberg. In 1966, the Duisburger Vertrag, an agreement between Bavaria and the Federal Republic of Germany, was reached for financing the completion of the project. The contract was signed on 16 September of that year in Duisburg by Federal Transport Minister Hans-Christoph Seebohm, Federal Finance Minister Rolf Dahlgrün, Bavarian Prime Minister Alfons Goppel and the Bavarian Finance Minister Konrad Pöhner.

On 25 September 1992, the canal was completed. The equivalent of some 2.3 billion euros were invested in the construction from 1960 to 1992. Almost 20 percent of that went for environmental protection projects.

Route 
From Bamberg to Fürth the canal follows the valley of the Regnitz, a tributary of the Main. From Fürth to beyond Roth it follows the valley of the Rednitz, a tributary of the Regnitz. It crosses the Franconian Jura mountains and joins the river Altmühl near Dietfurt. From Dietfurt to Kelheim on the Danube the canal follows the Altmühl valley.

The remnants of the Ludwig Canal
Today, there still exists between Nuremberg and Berching some 60 km of the Ludwig Canal in good condition. Some of the locks still function, and part of the towpath has been converted to a cycle track. The old canal comes close to the new canal at Pollanten, and from there the two canals flow downstream in parallel, eventually meeting 5km south of Berching.

Dimensions 

The cross-section of the waterway is normally trapezoidal, with  width at the bottom,  width at the water surface,  of water depth, and a side grade of 1:3. In the few sections with a rectangular profile, the width is usually  (i.e., the mean between top and bottom widths).

This is the highest point on Earth that is currently reached by commercial watercraft from the sea.

From the crest elevation down to the Altmühl at Dietfurt is a drop of  through three locks.

Locks
Along the course of the canal there are 16 locks with lifting heights of up to 25 meters. The 16 locks are managed from four remote control centres (Neuses since 2007, Kriegenbrunn, Hilpoltstein, and Dietfurt from the beginning of 2007). These centres are manned with one worker on the night shift, and two on the day shift. The locks were modernized from 2001 to 2007, replacing the outdated relay technology with programmable logic controllers (PLC). The cost was approximately $1.3 million per lock.

The summit water level is maintained by pumping water from the canal stretches below; and some water is drained into the summit level from local natural sources.

Thirteen locks are designed to conserve water, which they do by piping first the top third, and then the middle third of the lock water into side tanks during the down cycle. On the up cycle, these tanks replenish first the bottom third and then the middle third of the lock volume. The remaining top third is supplied by water from the upper level of the canal.

Commercial operation 
There were different forecasts of freight transport volumes, from which benefit–cost ratio could be derived. In 1981, a Federal Minister for Transport cost–benefit account assumed an estimated traffic volume of only 2.7 million tonnes per year for the Main-Danube Canal, and a benefit–cost ratio of 0.52:1. This might have justified the termination of the project. One of the proponents commissioned a study by the Ifo-Institut München, predicting an estimated 5.5 million tonnes per year for the traffic volume on the Main-Danube Canal. In 2004, the freight volume in exchange traffic totalled 5.9 million tonnes and the total transport 6.9 million tonnes.

The course of the planned extension of the Danube waterway between Passau and Kelheim is still controversial. Proponents argue that the cost structure of inland navigation will require larger ship sizes, so that larger lock dimensions, deeper channels and secure minimum water depth will be required. Opponents argue the environmental degradation is too great and that inland navigation is falling.

Transport volumes

Transport volumes for 2006 
The transport volume through the RMD Canal in 2006 was down almost 20% compared to the previous year.
 Total 6.24 million tonnes (2005: 7.598 million tonnes)
 Number of vessels 5,280 (6,467), of which 2,823 travelled in the direction of the Danube and 2,457 toward the Rhine
 The channel was closed due to ice at Nuremberg for 25 days for traffic in the direction of the Main, and for 37 days in the direction of the Danube.

The most important goods, which were transported on the canal toward the Danube:
 Food and feed: 836,186 tonnes
 Ores and scrap: 795,259 tonnes
 Iron, steel, non-ferrous metals: 103,547 tonnes
 Stones, soil, building rubble: 510,187 tonnes
 Fertilizers: 296,340 tonnes

Goods transported toward the Rhine
 Food and feed: 476,422 tonnes
 Iron, steel, non-ferrous metals: 419,459 tonnes
 Fertilizers: 295,701 tonnes.

The container traffic declined from 3,986 to 2,539 TEUs. Of these 85% were in the direction of Danube.

Meanwhile, tourism along the canal is economically important. This has contributed to the extensive creation of habitats to compensate for the canal.

Transport volumes 2010 
The transport volume in traffic between Main-Danube Canal and Danube (Kelheim lock) in 2010 consisted of the following items (in tons):

Freight volume by country between Main-Donau-Kanal and Donau (Kelheim Lock) in 2010:

Impact on ecology 

The construction of canals involves ecological dangers.  The Main-Danube Canal makes it possible for animals to spread from Western to Eastern Europe and in the opposite direction.  These so-called invasive species often cause difficulties in the ecosystem of their new home: competition with the species already living there, lack of predators, etc.  However, there is also the possibility that they will fit into the existing ecosystem and their introduction lead to an enrichment of the resident wildlife.

In order to maintain navigable water levels for the waterway in the Main, Regnitz, and Rednitz valleys, water must be diverted via the Altmühlüberleiter canal & tunnel from the upper Altmühl to the Brombachsee reservoirs, across the European Watershed between the drainage basins of the Danube and Rhine.

On the other hand, the canal carries traffic that would otherwise require 250,000 truck trips annually, or as an alternative, 3,000 freight trains on the Deutsche Bahn rail network.

Invasive animal species, east to west 
So far about 20 species of invertebrate animals and a number of fish have spread from the Danube to the Main, and on to the Rhine and Lake Constance.  The following list shows some examples:
 Fish
 Topmouth gudgeon (Pseudorasbora parva)
 Zarte (Vimba vimba)
 White-eye bream (Abramis sapa)
 Western tubenose goby (Proterorhinus semilunaris)
 Asp (Aspius aspius)
 Amphipods
 Dikerogammarus villosus
 Corophium curvispinum

Invasive animal species, west to east 
This exchange also works in the opposite direction.  Examples include:
 Asian clam (Corbicula fluminea)
 the freshwater shrimp (Atyaephyra desmaresti).
 the Chinese mitten crab (Eriocheir sinensis) (was found in the Austrian Danube in November 2002 for the first time).

1979 damburst at Katzwang 

The construction work was interrupted on 26 March 1979 by a serious accident in the Nuremberg district of Katzwang. A dam broke on the Eibach–Schwanstetten section, which was still under construction but already flooded.

During the rescue operations, a 12-year-old girl died. The damage was around DM 24 million (converted c. 12 million euros).

After the disaster, the entire canal line was checked for weaknesses and retrofitted at critical points.

Triathlon 
The long-distance Challenge Roth triathlon, which is held annually in July, includes a  swim in the Main-Danube Canal at Hilpoltstein. The canal is closed to vessel traffic during the race. An approximately -long section of the marathon route runs along the canal from the Hilpoltstein lock to the Leerstetten lock.

Notes

External links

 Structurae: Main-Danube Canal 
 Main-Donau-Kanal – Schiffe fahren über den Berg [Ships travel over the mountains] 
 Der Neue Kanal: Main-Donau-Kanal 
 Geschichte des Main-Donau Kanals, [History of the Main-Danube Canal] by Wilhelm Doni 
 RMD Wasserstraßen GmbH 
 Wasserstraßen- und Schifffahrtsamt Nürnberg 
 Bibliography on Water Resources and International Law Peace Palace Library

International canals
Ship canals
Canals in Germany
Danube
Federal waterways in Germany
Canals opened in 1992
CRhineMainDanube
CRhineMainDanube